Douglas Hapeman (1839–1905) was a Lieutenant Colonel in the 104th Illinois Infantry during the American Civil War, where he was awarded the Medal of Honor. He was born on January 15, 1839, in Ephratah, New York, and later moved to Illinois. Hapeman was awarded the medal for his actions on July 20, 1864, at the Battle of Peachtree Creek, Georgia. There, he "rallied his men under a severe attack, re-formed the broken ranks, and repulsed the attack," and acted with "conspicuous coolness and bravery." He was awarded his Medal of Honor on April 5, 1898.

After the war, he was elected as a companion of the Military Order of the Loyal Legion of the United States.

Hapeman was married to  Ella Thomas Hapeman (1849-1907), and had two kids after the Civil War: Mary T Hapeman Hoffman (1869-1940), and William Thomas Hapeman (1873-1949). Hapeman died on June 3, 1905, in Ottawa, Illinois, and is now buried in Ottawa Avenue Cemetery.

See also

Battle of Peachtree Creek
104th Illinois Infantry
Atlanta campaign

Notes

References

External links
Find a Grave, Douglas Hapeman

Union Army officers
United States Army Medal of Honor recipients
American Civil War recipients of the Medal of Honor
1839 births
1905 deaths
People from Fulton County, New York
People from Ottawa, Illinois
People of Illinois in the American Civil War